Émile Jean-Fontaine was a French sailor who competed in the 1900 Summer Olympics.

He was crew member of the French boat Gwendoline 2 which won a bronze medal in the first race of the 2 to 3 ton class. He also participated in the open class, but did not finish the race.

Further reading

References

External links

 

French male sailors (sport)
Sailors at the 1900 Summer Olympics – 2 to 3 ton
Sailors at the 1900 Summer Olympics – Open class
Olympic sailors of France
Year of birth missing
Year of death missing
Olympic bronze medalists for France
place of birth missing
Place of death missing